Clinical Psychology Review is a peer-reviewed academic journal that supports subscription based and open access publication of reviews on topics relevant to the field of clinical psychology. Gordon J. G. Asmundson (University of Regina) serves as the Editor-In-Chief of the journal with associate editors Ernst Koster (Universiteit Gent), Christine Purdon (University of Waterloo), Annemieke van Straten (Vrije Universiteit Amsterdam), and Michael J. Zvolensky (University of Houston). Clinical Psychology Review has a Cite Score of 18.1 and an impact factor of 12.792 (2020) ranking it 2nd out of 131 journals in clinical psychology.

Scope of Clinical Psychology Review

A broad range of topics are covered including but not limited to topics related to psychopathology, psychotherapy, behaviour therapy, cognitive therapies, behavioural medicine, community mental health, psychiatric assessment, and childhood development. The journal aims to publish papers contributing to the advancement of science and support for the practice of clinical psychology.

Indexing of Publications

Clinical Psychology Review is indexed in 7 international databases to promote global reach with inclusion in BIOSIS Citation Index, Current Contents – Social & Behavioral Sciences, Embase, Google Scholar, PsycINFO, PubMed/ Medline, and Scopus.

Submission of Manuscripts

More information regarding the manuscript submission process can be found upon review of the author submission guidelines. For authors interested in pursuing open access publishing with Clinical Psychology Review, more information can be found upon review of their open access options.

Diversity, Equity, and Inclusion

On September 20, 2021 Clinical Psychology Review pledges its commitment to improving the diversity of their editorial board and contributors while also making it a priority to increase attention to culture and diversity in published reviews. The senior editor team is equally distributed across North America and Europe and half are women. Data from January 2021 about their editorial board revealed the majority of members were affiliated with institutions in North America and approximately 40% were women. It has been made a priority for 2021-2022 that Clinical Psychology Review will work towards increasing the representation of women on the editorial board with aim of reaching 50% by August 2022. Of equal priority, the journal seeks to increase global balance of their editorial board and contributors to the journal over the next several years. By the end of 2022, Clinical Psychology Review plans to incorporate explicit guidance on reporting race, ethnicity, and other diversity characteristics for inclusion in their author submission guidelines. The pledge and associated aims by Clinical Psychology Review aligns with Elsevier's broader ongoing equity, diversity, and inclusion efforts as it is critical for these factors to be considered in achieving scientific excellence, innovation, and advancement. The journal believes in the power of an inclusive publishing environment not only to do what is right but to enrich, strengthen, and advance us all.

Members of Editorial Board

Ruth A. Baer (University of Kentucky), USA

Daniel Bagner (Florida International University), USA

Anna M. Bardone-Cone (The University of North Carolina at Chapel Hill), USA

Linda Booij (Concordia University), Canada

Andrew Busch (The Miriam Hospital, Centers for Behavioral and Preventive Medicine), USA

John Calamari (Rosalind Franklin University of Medicine), USA

Michael Christopher (Pacific University), USA

Pim Cuijpers (VU Amsterdamn), Netherlands

Melissa Cyders (Indiana University Purdue University Indianapolis), USA

Joanne Davis (University of Tulsa), USA

Jon D. Elhai (University of Toledo), USA

Brandon Gaudiano (Brown University), USA

David A. F. Haaga (American University), USA

Gretchen Haas (University of Pittsburgh), USA

Gerald Haeffel (University of Notre Dame), USA

Richard Hallam (London),United Kingdom

Martin Harrow (University of Illinois at Chicago College of Medicine), USA

Holly Hazlett-Stevens (University of Nevada Reno), USA

Eli Lebowitz (Yale University School of Medicine), USA

Ellen W. Leen-Feldner (University of Arkansas), USA

Carl Lejuez (University of Kansas), USA

Richard Moulding (Deakin University), Australia

Kim Mueser (Boston University), USA

Jeremy Pettit (Florida International University), USA

Suzanne Pineles (VA Boston Health Care System), USA

Mark D. Rapport (University of Central Florida), USA

Karen Rowa (McMaster University and St. Joseph's Healthcare Hamilton), Canada

Kristalyn Salters-Pedneault (Eastern Connecticut State University), USA

Donald Sharpe (University of Regina), Canada

Eric A Storch (Baylor College of Medicine), USA

Bruce Wampold (University of Wisconsin-Madison), USA

Carl F. Weems (Iowa State University), USA

Aviv Weinstein (Ariel University), Israel

Thomas A. Widiger (University of Kentucky), USA

Sabine Wilheln (Massachusetts General Hospital), USA

References

External links
 Clinical Psychology Review

Clinical psychology journals
Publications established in 1981
Review journals
Elsevier academic journals
Psychotherapy journals